Višković is a South Slavic surname. Notable people with the surname include:

Dalibor Višković (born 1977), Croatian footballer
Despot Višković (born 1980), Serbian footballer
Radovan Višković (born 1964), Bosnian politician

See also 
 Viškovci (disambiguation), names of several municipalities

Croatian surnames
Serbian surnames